"Aristocracy of officials" and "civil service aristocracy" (Danish and Norwegian: embedsaristokratiet or embetsaristokratiet) are terms used by historians to denote the elite social class (aristocracy) of university-educated higher state officials in Denmark and Norway from the early modern period until the 19th century. Particularly in Norway, which unlike Denmark had no significant nobility from the 17th century and which formally abolished nobility in 1821, the aristocracy of officials filled the vacant position at the top of society at the local, regional and national levels. Vidar L. Haanes notes that "in Norway the aristocracy of officials occupied the position in society held by the nobility elsewhere in Europe". This social group, principally constituted by priests, lawyers and doctors, has with reference to the 19th century also been called "the thousand academic families" by the historian Jens Arup Seip, and they comprised less than one per thousand in the overall population. By the 19th century Norway is widely considered to have been a "Civil Servant State," reflecting the role of the civil servants as "the most enduring, consistent and visible elite."

History
A higher official (embedsmand) in Denmark-Norway was by definition an official who had been appointed directly by the King, as opposed to lower officials. They included not only higher central government officials, but also all priests of the state church, all judges, lawyers (until the mid 19th century), county governors, university professors, military commissioned officers and other groups. This class is also frequently referred to as the estate of the officials (embedsstanden or embedsmandsstanden with different spellings), although the officials did never formally constitute an estate of the realm in the legal sense (with the exception of the clergy, who until the 19th century de jure formed one of the two privileged estates, although the estates had de facto lost much of their importance with the introduction of absolute monarchy in 1660). The term "aristocracy of officials" appears to have entered usage in the early 19th century. 

The "aristocracy of officials" was distinct from the nobility (adel). Some members of the class of officials were noble, while the vast majority were not. In Norway, "what little was left of the Norwegian nobility, which had constituted the elite in the country during the Middle Ages, quickly withered away after 1537." By 1600 Norway only had about a hundred men considered as nobles, and their number declined to only 30 by 1660. While most European countries were dominated by a noble class, in Norway "other social groups came to fill the vacant position at the top of society, burghers and officials."

Since the 16th century, offices in Denmark and Norway were also increasingly awarded based on merits and education, leading to the disappearance of the lower nobility as local elites, especially in Norway, as they were very often unable to afford costly university education abroad, and its gradual replacement as an elite by a class of university-educated higher officials, often of Danish or German origin. This development continued with the introduction of absolute and hereditary monarchy in 1660 in Denmark, which significantly weakened the political power of the still influential Danish nobility in favour of the King and the state administration and officials directly subordinate to the King. The kings from the 17th century and later periods tended to increasingly appoint non-nobles to state offices, to which nobles previously had had a monopoly, and noble status in the absolute monarchy came to be seen as mostly symbolic. Norway was different from Denmark in the fact that the Danish nobility still comprised a significant number and were wealthy and at least socially, if not politically, influential, while the nobility as a group was both politically, socially and economically insignificant, and increasingly so, in Norway. Nobility was formally abolished by the Norwegian Parliament in 1821, at which point the nobility comprised only a few families, virtually all of which were recently ennobled or foreign noble families rather than descendants of the original Norwegian nobility.

In most rural localities and districts in Norway, the local and regional clergy (such as parish priests and provosts) and the district judge were typically the foremost members of their communities from the 16–17th centuries and onwards, and in some cases, their offices were in practice semi-hereditary. Very often, the priest's estate was the largest and most prominent farm or estate in any given community. According to Hoffmann, "the priests were an important part of the aristocracy of officials. They were the representatives of the king in their districts." During the absolute monarchy, the priests were "an important instrument for royal power in the local communities. The priest was the representative of the state, both in the religious area and other areas of society."

Vidar L. Haanes notes:

Whereas most European nations at the time typically were dominated by a noble class, Norway during the 19th century is widely described as "the state of the officials", reflecting the role of the officials as the dominant social and political class in the state at the national, regional and local level. The term "state of the officials" was introduced by the historian Jens Arup Seip, who also refers to this group as an "aristocracy of officials." According to Seip, "the thousand academic families" completely dominated the state and particularly the civil service, the government and the parliament during the 19th century. The historian Øystein Rian describes the aristocracy of officials in Norway as "a nobility-resembling elite;" in many respects they occupied a similar position in society as the French nobles of the Robe. According to Seip, this class had in common a university education, Danish language (with Norwegian pronunciation), often a Danish or German-sounding family name, and sympathies for and in many cases family or other ties to Denmark. They comprised less than one per thousand in the overall population.

The civil servant class is also included in the broader term patriciate, together with the burghers in the cities.

References

Denmark–Norway
Oligarchy
High society (social class)
Government officials
Danish civil servants
19th-century Norwegian civil servants
Power (social and political) concepts
Elite theory
Civil service of Denmark